Feast or Fired is a professional wrestling match concept featured in Impact Wrestling. The idea is based on the object on a pole match, which sees wrestlers trying to gain possession of items hanging from poles attached to the ring posts. In this case, the participants in the match try to grab one of four briefcases from the poles. In the match itself, a wrestler can only claim a briefcase if he/she leaves the ring with it and both feet touch the floor.

Stipulations
Inside each of the briefcases is some sort of paperwork. One of the cases holds a contract for an Impact World Championship match, one holds a contract for an Impact X Division Championship match, and one holds a contract for an Impact World Tag Team Championship match (with a partner of that wrestler's choosing). The fourth and final briefcase contains a pink slip, which fires the wrestler carrying it. (The 2016 edition replaced the X Division championship contract with one for the TNA King of the Mountain Championship.)

The winners of the briefcases do not reveal what is in them that night. Instead, they are revealed in a segment on a later episode of Impact!. Before the contents of the cases are revealed, each wrestler is given a choice to keep their case or forfeit it, which protects the wrestler from being fired, but also gives up any potential title match.

Once a wrestler wins a briefcase, it may be (and has been) defended in matches similar to the way championships are.

The allocated time period during which a wrestler must invoke their title opportunity has not been explicitly stated, all that has been said is that the title opportunity can be invoked "anywhere, anytime", making it similar in fashion to the WWE Money in the Bank ladder match contract, which lasts for one year.

Matches

Feast or Fired information

Record

Matches

References

Professional wrestling match types
Impact Wrestling match types
Impact Wrestling